The 2000 Silicon Valley Football Classic was a post-season college football bowl game between the Air Force Falcons and the Fresno State Bulldogs on December 31, 2000, at Spartan Stadium in San Jose, California. Air Force won the game 37–34; while Air Force led 34–7 at halftime, Fresno State came within three points of tying the game before failing to score on a fake field goal in the last minute of the game.

References

Silicon Valley Classic
Silicon Valley Football Classic
Air Force Falcons football bowl games
Fresno State Bulldogs football bowl games
2000 in sports in California
December 2000 sports events in the United States